Spirotropis cymothoe is a species of sea snail, a marine gastropod mollusk in the family Drilliidae.

Description
The length of the (decollated) shell attains 9 mm, its diameter 5 mm.

(Original description) The shell much resembles Cryptogemma calypso Dall, 1919, from which it differs by having the anal fasciole striated spirally, the surface in front of the shoulder without spiral sculpture and minutely vermiculate, the ribs more knob-like, shorter, and averaging about 12 on the body whorl. The shell contains 6 whorls. The apex is always eroded.

Distribution
This marine species occurs in the Pacific Ocean off San Diego, Lower California at a depth of 650 m.

References

External links
  Tucker, J.K. 2004 Catalog of recent and fossil turrids (Mollusca: Gastropoda). Zootaxa 682:1–1295

cymothoe
Gastropods described in 1919